1980 in the Philippines details events of note that happened in the Philippines in the year 1980.

Incumbents

 President: Ferdinand Marcos  (KBL)
 Prime Minister: Ferdinand Marcos  (KBL)
House Speaker: Querube Makalintal
 Chief Justice: Enrique Fernando.

Events

January
 January 30 – The nation's first local elections in the martial law era are held, wherein the administration party Kilusang Bagong Lipunan (New Society Movement) wins almost all local seats.

February
 April 22 – Passenger ship MV Don Juan bound for Bacolod City sinks in Tablas Strait, 20 nautical miles (37 km) off Maestre de Campo Island, Romblon after colliding with the oil tanker M/T Tacloban City. Reported casualties were 18 dead and 115 missing, with 745 survivors.

May
 May 1 – Kilusang Mayo Uno (May First Movement) is organized.
 May 8 – Detained Sen. Benigno Aquino Jr. is released and flies to Texas, United States to undergo heart bypass surgery.
 May 26 – The Kabataang Barangay elections (KB) were held. About 3 million Filipino youths aged 15 to 18 years old participated.

Holidays

As per Act No. 2711 section 29, issued on March 10, 1917, any legal holiday of fixed date falls on Sunday, the next succeeding day shall be observed as legal holiday. Sundays are also considered legal religious holidays. Bonifacio Day was added through Philippine Legislature Act No. 2946. It was signed by then-Governor General Francis Burton Harrison in 1921. On October 28, 1931, the Act No. 3827 was approved declaring the last Sunday of August as National Heroes Day. As per Republic Act No. 3022, April 9 was proclaimed as Bataan Day. Independence Day was changed from July 4 (Philippine Republic Day) to June 12 (Philippine Independence Day) on August 4, 1964.

 January 1 – New Year's Day
 February 22 – Legal Holiday
 April 3 – Maundy Thursday
 April 4 – Good Friday
 April 9 – Araw ng Kagitingan (Day of Valor)
 May 1 – Labor Day
 June 12 – Independence Day 
 July 4 – Philippine Republic Day
 August 13  – Legal Holiday
 August 31 – National Heroes Day
 September 21 – Thanksgiving Day
 November 30 – Bonifacio Day
 December 25 – Christmas Day
 December 30 – Rizal Day

Entertainment and culture

Unknown
 October - The religious show Ang Dating Daan starts its radio broadcast through DWWA.

Births
 January 15 – Sam Oh, TV host and radio DJ
 January 16 – Drew Arellano, TV host and actor
 January 20 – Jaybee Sebastian, high profile inmate at New Bilibid Prison (d. 2020)
 February 7 – Adrian Alandy, actor
 February 8 – Jenny Miller, Canadian-Filipino actress
 February 16 – Mark Lapid, actor and politician
 March 1 – Cassandra Ponti, actress, dancer, and model
 March 3 – Christian Coronel, basketball player
 March 7 – Froilan Baguion, basketball player
 March 11 – Yancy de Ocampo, basketball player
 April 23 – Bobby Pacquiao, boxer and politician
 April 27 – Jason Gainza, actor and comedian
 May 13 – Mau Marcelo, singer
 May 20 – Hayden Kho, cosmetic surgeon and entrepreneur
 June 1 – Ryan Luis Singson, politician
 June 16 – Philip Butel, basketball player
 July 2 – Ciara Sotto, actress and singer
 July 6 – JB Magsaysay, actor, businessman and politician
 July 24 – Cheska Garcia, actress and model
 August 2 – Dingdong Dantes, actor
 August 17 – Tootsie Guevara, singer
 August 19 – Cyrus Baguio. basketball player
 September 16 – Kitchie Nadal singer, songwriter
 October 1 – Phoemela Baranda, television personality
 October 5 – LJ Moreno, actress
 October 11 – Justin Cuyugan, actor
 October 17 – Don Dulay, basketball player
 October 30 – Rich Alvarez, basketball player and coach
 November 1 – Nina, singer
 November 10 – Mike Cortez, basketball player
 November 27 – Dan Campilan, television journalist (d. 2006)
 December 2 – Thor, singer

Deaths
 January 26 – Cecilio Putong, educator, writer, and author (b. 1891)
 February 24 – Jorge B. Vargas, lawyer and diplomat (b. 1890)
 December 12 – Severino Montano, actor, director and playwright (b. 1915)

References